Zacanthoides is an extinct Cambrian genus of corynexochid trilobite. It was a nektobenthic predatory carnivore. Its remains have been found in Canada (British Columbia, especially in the Burgess Shale, and Newfoundland), Greenland, Mexico, and the United States (Alaska, Nevada, Utah, Vermont, and Idaho for which Z. idahoensis is named). Its major characteristics are a slender exoskeleton with 9 thoracic segments, pleurae with long spines, additional spines on the axial rings, and a pygidium that is considerably smaller than its cephalon.

Species
Z. idahoensis
Z. kelsayae
Z. romingeri (type species)
Z. holopygus (unrecognized)
Z. gilberti (unrecognized)

Synonyms
Embolimus is a synonym.

References

External links 
 

Corynexochida genera
Corynexochina
Cambrian trilobites
Burgess Shale animals
Fossil taxa described in 1888
Wheeler Shale
Paleozoic life of Newfoundland and Labrador

Cambrian genus extinctions